"Lovebug" is a song by the American group Jonas Brothers. It was released as the third official single off their third studio album, A Little Bit Longer, on September 8, 2008. Lyrically, "Lovebug" is about being smitten by girl for the first time and attracting feelings for said girl from that moment. A music video was released to accompany the single and is a period piece romance that was inspired by The Notebook.

Background and composition

The song was written while on tour with Miley Cyrus on her Best of Both Worlds Tour. Nick said that "we were in the hotel room and sat down that night and wrote it in about 15 or 20 minutes." The song was confirmed to be the second single from the album on August 12, 2008.

The song first premiered at the 2008 MTV Video Music Awards when the Jonas Brothers performed it at the back lot of Paramount Studios in Hollywood, California.

Music video
Disney Channel featured the Sunday night premiere of the "Lovebug" music video on October 19, 2008 (8:55 p.m., ET/PT). An exclusive look at the making of the video was presented throughout the evening (8:00 – 9:00 p.m., ET/PT) during episodes of Hannah Montana and Wizards of Waverly Place.

Directed by Philip Andelman (who has directed music videos for Demi Lovato and John Mayer), is a period piece that depicts the love story between a young woman and a sailor as he is preparing to deploy to war. Kevin Jonas explained that The Notebook was one of the inspirations for the video.

Kevin, Joe and Nick portray different characters, including members of a ballroom band. A sweeping dance routine, 1950s fashion and cars bring the Jonas Brothers' vision to life. Camilla Belle and Josh Boswell also star.

In popular media
 The Jonas Brothers made a cameo in Night at the Museum: Battle of the Smithsonian as cherubs. They sang a snippet of the song immediately after singing a cover of Celine Dion's "My Heart Will Go On" from Titanic.
 Performed on a Dancing with the Stars season seven result show by Mark Ballas, Derek Hough, Lacey Schwimmer, and Inna Brayer.
 The first verse was sung and played by John Grimes on the ITV2 show Jedward: Let Loose.

Track listing
CD single
"Lovebug" – 3:40
"Shelf" (Live Version) – 4:54

10" picture disc
"Lovebug" – 3:41
"Lovebug" (Live in Los Angeles 2013) – 4:17

Chart performance
"Lovebug" debuted on the week ending September 27, 2008 at number 84 on the Billboard Hot 100 chart. It first peaked at number 57 on the week ending November 9, 2008 before leaving five weeks later. On the week ending January 10, 2009, it reappeared and reached a new peak at number 49. It has sold 857,000 copies in the US. It debuted at number 84 on the Canadian Hot 100 and first peaked at number 70 before falling off the chart and reappearing on the week ending January 10, 2009 at number 45. The song was given a digital release in Australia and peaked at number 95.

Charts

Release history

References

2007 songs
2008 singles
2009 singles
Jonas Brothers songs
Songs written by Kevin Jonas
Songs written by Joe Jonas
Songs written by Nick Jonas
Hollywood Records singles
Music videos directed by Philip Andelman
Song recordings produced by John Fields (record producer)